Ballamenagh Halt (Manx: Stadd Valley Meanagh) is a request stop on the Manx Electric Railway on the Isle of Man.

Location

The halt is located at the side of the main Douglas to Laxey road which runs parallel along this particular section of the tramway.  Nearby is a local housing estate which the stop serves.

Facilities

This stop doubles up as a bus stop in connection with the island's Bus Vannin services which are operated by the same government department as the tramway.  Despite being a little-used rural halt, it was equipped with a modern bus shelter in 2000 with the dual purpose of providing shelter to bus customers also; it is in close proximity to the next official station on the line and sees little use for this reason.

Also
Manx Electric Railway Stations

References

Sources
 Manx Manx Electric Railway Stopping Places (2002) Manx Electric Railway Society
 Island Island Images: Manx Electric Railway Pages (2003) Jon Wornham
 Official Tourist Department Page (2009) Isle Of Man Heritage Railways

Railway stations in the Isle of Man
Manx Electric Railway
Railway stations opened in 1894